Harrower is an Anglo-Saxon surname. The first people to use the name were those who cultivated land (harrowed).

List of notable people surnamed Harrower
David Harrower (born 1966), Scottish playwright 
Elizabeth Harrower (actress) (1918–2003), American actress and screenwriter
Elizabeth Harrower (writer) (1928–2020), Australian novelist and short story writer
Gabriel T. Harrower (1816–1895), New York politician
Henry Harrower (1883–1934), American endocrinologist
Jimmy Harrower (footballer, born 1935) (1935–2006), Scottish footballer
Jimmy Harrower (footballer, born 1924) (1924–1992), Scottish footballer
John Douglas Harrower (born 1947), Anglican Bishop of Tasmania
Kristi Harrower (born March 4, 1975), Australian basketball player
Molly Harrower (1906–1999), South African clinical psychologist
Pat Harrower (1860–?), Scottish rugby player
William Harrower, Scottish international footballer

See also
Harrower Glacier
Heru'ur, character in the television show Stargate SG-1
The Harrowers, horror comic (also Clive Barker's The Harrowers)

Notes

Occupational surnames
English-language occupational surnames